Slovenian Catholic Girl Guides and Boy Scouts Association (abbreviated ZSKSS) is the national Guiding organization of Slovenia.

Slovenian Catholic Girl Guides and Boy Scouts Association (ZSKSS) is Slovenian Scout and Guide association, established in 1990.

ZSKSS was the first catholic youth and non communist organisation, established in one of former Yugoslav republics. It was reborn on experiences and values from other scout and guide associations, especially by support of AGESCI (Associazione Guide e Scout Cattolici Italiani)  leaders from Friuli-Venezia Giulia, who helped much establishing the concept of the organizations activities (structure, education, programme).

ZSKSS is affiliated to the Slovenska Zamejska Skavtska Organizacija (SZSO) serving Slovenian Scouts in Friuli-Venezia Giulia in Italy, and also to the Associazione Guide e Scouts Cattolici Italiani (AGESCI).

History
The history of Scouting in Slovenia dates to the former Kingdom of Yugoslavia. In 1922, a meeting (slet) of Sokol, an important Pan-Slavic movement and sport organisation in Yugoslavia, took place in Ljubljana, where Bosnian and Serbian Scouts also attended. Scouting was officially established in Slovenia in October 1922, and soon a large number of Scout groups in Slovenia contributed to the establishment of the common Scout Region (named Župa) for Croatia and Slovenia, founded in Osijek. The Slovenian own Scout Region was established in early 1923 at Ljubljana. The first Slovene Scout and Guide camp was organized during the summer of 1923 at Kamniška Bistrica. 

Scouting in Slovenia was officially dissolved on June 10, 1941 because of World War II. Just prior to the dissolution, there were 1,380 members of the Slovene Scout Organization.

Slovene Scout groups in exile, in Italy and Austria
Slovene Scouting continued after the war, in exile, at first at refugee camps in Carinthia, and afterwards in Slovene communities in Argentina and also Canada, among the Slovenes living in Italy at Gorizia, Trieste and nearby. The Scouting was organized among the Slovene ethnic groups in neighboring countries: The Slovene Carinthian Scouts organisation (1957) in Austria (today part of the Pfadfinder und Pfadfinderinnen Österreichs); the Slovene Scouts of Trieste (Slovenska Zamejska Skavtska Organizacija) (1951 at Trieste) for boys and in 1958 for girls; and the Slovene Scouts of Gorizia (SZSO - ) (1963) for girls and 1964 for boys as well.

ZSKSS establishment
In 1984, a secondary school student from Ljubljana, Peter Lovšin, became acquainted with the Scout Movement. He decided to begin apolitical Scouting in Ljubljana. In the summer of 1985 he went to camp with Scouts from Gorizia, and in 1986 he made the Scout Promise as one of their rank. In the same year he gathered a group of young people around him in one of the Catholic parishes of Ljubljana, with assistance from Slovene Scouts from Trieste and Gorizia. The group was growing and in autumn 1988 was moved to another parish of Ljubljana. During the Saint George feast of 1989, 12 boys and girls made the Scout Promise, and by 1990, there were 21 Girl Guides and 18 Boy Scouts. The Catholic Scout Movement began to spread all over Slovenia. The first legal Scout Promises were made by 29 Girl Guides and Boy Scouts, in a suburb of Ljubljana on May 20 of that year. Officially the ZSKSS was registered on Sunday, October 22, 1992.

International membership
In 1996 ZSKSS was accepted as an associate member of WAGGGS. ZSKSS received full membership in WAGGGS in 1999.
For individual members of ZSKSS, the Zveza tabornikov Slovenije, the Slovenian WOSM member, guarantees the right of personal WOSM-membership and to participate as well to the international scout events (like Jamboree's) and educational activities.

Program and organisation 
The primary purpose of the Association is to contribute to the fully physical, mental, spiritual and social development of young people so that they could become people of strong character, responsible citizens and members of local, national and international communities. It has the status of an association of public interest in Slovenia on the field of education and has status of a national youth organization also.

In addition to volunteers, the organization has some full-time employees (a secretary and professional workers). The offices in Ljubljana are in a long-term lease and Association signed long-term lease contract with the Slovenia Forest Service for a house in Kočevski rog officially (Environmental Scout Centre Kočevski Rog). The local scout groups (called  in Slovene) are a strong network in local communities, well organized and informed, supported by internet web pages or Facebook group sites. Association developed contacts with large range of target groups, and at the same time a great support apparatus of volunteers across Slovenia.

Sections
The association works in four age sections:
  (Beaver Scouts, both genders) - ages 6 to 7
  (Cub Scouts; both genders) - ages 7 to 11
  (Rangers/Rovers) - ages 16 to 21

Mottos
The Beavers Scout Motto:  (Solid dam)  The Cubs Scout Motto:  (Best as possible), The Scouts/Guides Motto:  (Be Prepared), The Rover Scouts Motto:  (To serve).

Scout Oath

On my honor I promise that with divine help I will conscientiously serve God and my native land, help other people and obey the Guide/Scout Law.

Scout Laws
A Guide's/Scout's honor is to be trusted.
A Guide/Scout is loyal to God and homeland.
A Guide/Scout helps others and does at least one Good Turn every day.
A Guide/Scout is a friend to all, and a sister/brother to every other Scout.
A Guide/Scout is courteous.
A Guide/Scout respects nature seeing it as the work of God.
A Guide/Scout obeys her/his parents and her/his superiors and conscientiously performs her/his duties.
A Guide/Scout whistles and sings in troubles.
A Guide/Scout is hard-working and thrifty.
A Guide/Scout is clean in thought, word, and deed.

References

Sources
 World Association of Girl Guides and Girl Scouts, World Bureau (1997), Trefoil Round the World. Eleventh Edition 1997. 
 Grašič, Miroslava, Skavti in gozdovniki na Slovenskem: Taborniška gibanja med Slovenci v domovini, zamejstvu, Argentini in Kanadi v 20. stoletju, Maribor 1990, Muzej narodne osvoboditve Maribor  
 Fužir, Barbara, Skavti: 25 zgodb za 25 let delovanja Združenja, Ljubljana 2015, ZSKSS

Official Website 
Slovenian Catholic Girl Guides and Boy Scouts Association homepage, retrieved 6.4.2016

World Association of Girl Guides and Girl Scouts member organizations
Scouting and Guiding in Slovenia
Youth organizations established in 1990